The Weeks are an American rock band Florence, Mississippi, United States. 

The band was formed by Cain Barnes, Chaz Lindsay, Cyle Barnes, Damien Bone and Samuel Williams in March 2006 when they were between 14 and 16 years old. The band signed to the Esperanza Plantation label, with the debut album, Comeback Cadillac, released in July 2008. The album blended southern rock and alternative, and featured a duet with labelmate Allie Peden on "Sailor Song".  Their debut EP, Rumspringa, followed in 2009.

After some lineup changes that left them with a four-piece of the Barnes twins, Bone and Williams, the band relocated to Nashville, Tennessee. In March 2011, they returned to Water Valley, Mississippi, to work with Winn McElroy at his Black Wings Studio on the eight songs that encompass a 12" EP entitled, "Gutter Gaunt Gangster", out October 11, 2011, on Esperanza Plantation. They spent the next six months touring with Junior Astronomers, Local H, North Mississippi All-Stars, Sol Cat, and The Meat Puppets. After signing with Kings of Leon's new record label Serpents and Snakes, they re-released Gutter Gaunt Gangster September 25, 2012. Their second full-length, Dear Bo Jackson, was released in the spring of 2013. This was followed by the release of Easy in 2017, and, most recently, Two Moons in the summer of 2019.

Discography

Studio albums
Dog Days (2006), Olympic Records (Out of print)
Comeback Cadillac (2008), Esperanza Plantation
Gutter Gaunt Gangster (2012), Serpents & Snakes RecordsDear Bo Jackson (2013), Serpents & Snakes RecordsEasy (2017), Lightning RodTwo Moons (2019), Crooked Letter RecordsTwisted Rivers (2020), Crooked Letter Records

Extended playsRumspringa EP (2009), Esperanza PlantationButtons EP'' (2014), Serpents & Snakes Records

Members
Current
Cyle Barnes - Lead Vocals
Samuel Williams - Guitar, Vocals
Cain Barnes - Drums
Damien Bone - Bass
Former
Chaz Lindsay - Rhythm Guitar (2006–2009)
Alex Collier - Piano, Organ, Vocals (2011-2015)

References

Alternative rock groups from Mississippi
Garage punk groups
American southern rock musical groups
Musicians from Jackson, Mississippi